Target of rapamycin complex 2 subunit MAPKAP1 is a protein that in humans is encoded by the MAPKAP1 gene.  As the name indicates, it is a subunit of  mTOR complex 2.

This gene encodes a protein that is highly similar to the yeast SIN1 protein, a stress-activated protein kinase. Alternatively spliced transcript variants encoding distinct isoforms have been described. Alternate polyadenylation sites as well as alternate 3' UTRs have been identified for transcripts of this gene.

References

Further reading